City Hall station is an underground rapid transit station on the PATCO Speedline, operated by the Delaware River Port Authority. It is located in Camden, New Jersey, one block from Camden City Hall, after which the station is named, at North 5th and Market Streets. Opened on June 7, 1936, the station is the first eastbound and final westbound station in New Jersey, located just east of the Benjamin Franklin Bridge which carries trains over the Delaware River.

History 

The station was opened on June 7, 1936, along with 8th & Market and Franklin Square in Philadelphia and Broadway in Camden, as part of Philadelphia Rapid Transit's Bridge Line service. The Bridge Line was temporarily closed on December 28, 1968, for conversion into the PATCO Speedline. The section between  Lindenwold and City Hall opened on January 4, 1969, followed a few weeks later by the section between City Hall and Philadelphia on February 14.

City Hall station is among PATCO's least utilized stops. The station was built with corridors to both Arch Street and Cooper Street, with separate entrances on the north and south corners of Cooper and 5th Street. Due to the low passenger levels at this station, both corridors are closed. Two stairways are visible at the northeast and southwest corners of Market and 5th Street. Only the southwest is in use for passenger access, as the northeast stairway is marked for emergency use only.  

PATCO plans to make the station accessible to people with disabilities, adding an elevator between the platform and the mezzanine, and a new entrance with an elevator at Roosevelt Park, across 5th Street from the current entrance. The project is expected to be completed in Fall 2022.

In August 2022, PATCO eliminated 24-hour service at the station, with the station closing daily between midnight and 5 am. PATCO cited low ridership, safety concerns, and the nearby Broadway station as reasons for the closure.

Notable places nearby 
The station is within walking distance of the following notable places:
 Camden City Hall
 Camden County College
 Camden Waterfront
 Rutgers University–Camden
 Rowan University

References

External links 
City Hall (PATCO)

PATCO Speedline stations in New Jersey
Transportation in Camden, New Jersey
Railway stations in the United States opened in 1936
Transit hubs serving New Jersey
Buildings and structures in Camden, New Jersey
1936 establishments in New Jersey
Railway stations located underground in Pennsylvania